Annelis Schreiber (1927–2010) was a German botanist, lichenologist, and author who worked at the Botanische Staatssammlung München. She is noted her research on the plants of South West Africa, as well as her work with Gustav Hegi and Karl Heinz Rechinger in writing Illustrierte Flora von Mittel-Europa, a comprehensive flora of Central Europe. She described over 20 species.

References 

1927 births
2010 deaths
German women scientists
Women botanists
20th-century German botanists
20th-century women scientists
21st-century German botanists
21st-century women scientists
German lichenologists
20th-century German women
21st-century German women